The Communist Party of the Republic of Tatarstan was a communist political party that existed from 1991 to 1997 in Tatarstan, nowadays a federal subject of Russia (a republic), but at that time it was a self-proclaimed republic.

The party was founded from the Tatar ASSR department of CPSU in December 1991 and was led by Robert Sadykov, who is also Deputy President of the Public Movement "People's Patriotic Union of Russia". In March 1997 it merged with the Communist Party of the Russian Federation.

Sadykov obtained 4.43% of the votes in the March 25, 2001 presidential election in Tatarstan.

The KPRT was affiliated to the Union of Communist Parties - Communist Party of the Soviet Union (UCP-CPSU). 

During Soviet times, one of the leaders of the Communist Party of the Tatar Autonomous Soviet Socialist Republic was Fikryat Tabeyev, who after his resignation served as USSR's ambassador to Afghanistan. He was followed by Rashid Musin, Gumer Usmanov, and Mintimer Shaimiyev.

References

External links
  Official website

1991 establishments in Russia
Defunct communist parties in Russia
Political parties established in 1991
Political parties of minorities in Russia
Politics of Tatarstan
1997 disestablishments in Russia
Political parties disestablished in 1997